Bethnal Green is an area of East London, England.

Bethnal Green can also refer to:

Metropolitan Borough of Bethnal Green
Bethnal Green tube station, scene of a serious disaster in 1943
Bethnal Green railway station